Ronnie Suzanne Gibbons (born 16 January 1980) is a former professional footballer. She played as a right-back for Fulham Ladies and the Republic of Ireland national team.

Club career
Gibbons joined Fulham as a 13-year-old and became captain at the age of 17. Three years later in 2000, when Fulham became the first full-time professional women's football club in Europe, Gibbons was one of six existing players to be kept on. The more experienced Katrine Pedersen took over the captaincy during the 2000–01 season, as Fulham won the South East Combination but lost the FA Women's Cup final to Arsenal.

Over the next two seasons Gibbons remained with Fulham as they won successive trebles of Southern Premier, League Cup and FA Women's Cup in 2001–02 and National Premier, League Cup and FA Women's Cup in 2002–03. She was named as a substitute in both FA Women's Cup final wins.

Gibbons joined Charlton Athletic shortly after Fulham reverted to semi-pro status in 2003. She made her debut against Tranmere Rovers on 9 November 2003.

International career
Although born in Wandsworth, Gibbons was eligible for the Republic of Ireland as her grandparents were from Galway and County Mayo. She was invited for a trial in April 1999 while still playing in the Greater London League with Fulham and made her debut in January 2000.

References

Fulham L.F.C. players
Charlton Athletic W.F.C. players
Footballers from Wandsworth
Republic of Ireland women's international footballers
FA Women's National League players
1980 births
Living people
Republic of Ireland women's association footballers
Women's association football defenders